Hackerville is an international co-produced Romanian and German language television drama series consisting of six episodes, which aired on HBO Europe and German TNT Serie channel in November–December 2018.

Cast 

 Anna Schumacher
 Andi Vasluianu
 Voicu Dumitras

Episodes

References 

Grimme-Preis for fiction winners
2010s Romanian television series
German-language television shows
2018 German television series debuts